Sanilhac is a commune in the department of Dordogne, southwestern France. The municipality was established on 1 January 2017 by merger of the former communes of Notre-Dame-de-Sanilhac (the seat), Breuilh and Marsaneix.

Population

See also 
Communes of the Dordogne department

References 

Communes of Dordogne